In mathematics, exponentiation is an operation involving two numbers, the base and the exponent or power. When  is a positive integer, exponentiation corresponds to repeated multiplication of the base: that is,  is the product of multiplying  bases:

The exponent is usually shown as a superscript to the right of the base. In that case,  is called "b raised to the nth power", "b (raised) to the power of n", "the nth power of b", "b to the nth power", or most briefly as "b to the nth".

Starting from the basic fact stated above that, for any positive integer ,  is  occurrences of  all multiplied by each other, several other properties of exponentiation directly follow. In particular:

In other words, when multiplying a base raised to one exponent by the same base raised to another exponent, the exponents add. From this basic rule that exponents add, we can derive that  must be equal to 1, as follows. For any , . Dividing both sides by  gives .

The fact that  can similarly be derived from the same rule. For example, . Taking the cube root of both sides gives .

The rule that multiplying makes exponents add can also be used to derive the properties of negative integer exponents. Consider the question of what  should mean. In order to respect the "exponents add" rule, it must be the case that . By a similar argument, .

The properties of fractional exponents also follow from the same rule. For example, suppose we consider  and ask if there is some suitable exponent,  which we may call , such that . From the definition of the square root, we have that . Therefore, the exponent  must be such that . Using the fact that multiplying makes exponents add gives . Equating the exponents on both sides, we have . Therefore, so .

The definition of exponentiation can be extended to allow any real or complex exponent. Exponentiation by integer exponents can also be defined for a wide variety of algebraic structures, including matrices.

Exponentiation is used extensively in many fields, including economics, biology, chemistry, physics, and computer science, with applications such as compound interest, population growth, chemical reaction kinetics, wave behavior, and public-key cryptography.

History of the notation 
The term power is a mistranslation of the ancient Greek δύναμις (dúnamis, here: "amplification") used by the Greek mathematician Euclid for the square of a line, following Hippocrates of Chios. In the 9th century, the Persian mathematician Muhammad ibn Mūsā al-Khwārizmī used the terms مَال (māl, "possessions", "property") for a square—the Muslims, "like most mathematicians of those and earlier times, thought of a squared number as a depiction of an area, especially of land, hence property"—and كَعْبَة (kaʿbah, "cube") for a cube, which later Islamic mathematicians represented in mathematical notation as the letters mīm (m) and kāf (k), respectively, by the 15th century, as seen in the work of Abū al-Hasan ibn Alī al-Qalasādī.

In the late 16th century, Jost Bürgi used Roman numerals for exponents.

Nicolas Chuquet used a form of exponential notation in the 15th century, which was later used by Henricus Grammateus and Michael Stifel in the 16th century. The word exponent was coined in 1544 by Michael Stifel. Samuel Jeake introduced the term indices in 1696. In the 16th century, Robert Recorde used the terms square, cube, zenzizenzic (fourth power), sursolid (fifth), zenzicube (sixth), second sursolid (seventh), and zenzizenzizenzic (eighth). Biquadrate has been used to refer to the fourth power as well.

Early in the 17th century, the first form of our modern exponential notation was introduced by René Descartes in his text titled La Géométrie; there, the notation is introduced in Book I.

Some mathematicians (such as René Descartes) used exponents only for powers greater than two, preferring to represent squares as repeated multiplication.

Another historical synonym, involution, is now rare and should not be confused with its more common meaning.

In 1748, Leonhard Euler introduced variable exponents, and, implicitly, non-integer exponents by writing:

Terminology

When it is a positive integer, the exponent indicates how many copies of the base are multiplied together. For example, . Here,  is the 5th power of 3, or 3 raised to the 5th power.

The word "raised" is usually omitted, and sometimes "power" as well, so  can be simply read "3 to the 5th", or "3 to the 5". Therefore, the exponentiation  can be expressed as "b to the power of n", "b to the nth power", "b to the nth", or most briefly as "b to the n".

For example writing  is equivalent to writing . This can be generalized to where writing  means .

Integer exponents
The exponentiation operation with integer exponents may be defined directly from elementary arithmetic operations.

Positive exponents
The definition of the exponentiation as an iterated multiplication can be formalized by using induction, and this definition can be used as soon one has an associative multiplication:

The base case is 

and the recurrence is

and

Zero exponent
By definition, any nonzero number raised to the  power is :

This definition is the only possible that allows extending the formula

to zero exponents. It may be used in every algebraic structure with a multiplication that has an identity.

So, the equality  is a special case of the general convention for the empty product.

In contexts where only integer powers are considered, the value  is generally assigned to  but, otherwise, the choice of whether to assign it a value and what value to assign may depend on context.

Negative exponents
Exponentiation with negative exponents is defined by the following identity, which holds for any integer  and nonzero :
.
Raising 0 to a negative exponent is undefined but, in some circumstances, it may be interpreted as infinity.

This definition of exponentiation with negative exponents is the only one that allows extending the identity  to negative exponents (consider the case ).

The same definition applies to invertible elements in a multiplicative monoid, that is, an algebraic structure, with an associative multiplication and a multiplicative identity denoted  (for example, the square matrices of a given dimension). In particular, in such a structure, the inverse of an invertible element  is standardly denoted

Identities and properties

The following identities, often called , hold for all integer exponents, provided that the base is non-zero:

Unlike addition and multiplication, exponentiation is not commutative. For example, .  Also unlike addition and multiplication, exponentiation is not associative. For example, whereas . Without parentheses, the conventional order of operations for serial exponentiation in superscript notation is top-down (or right-associative), not bottom-up (or left-associative). That is, 

which, in general, is different from

Powers of a sum
The powers of a sum can normally be computed from the powers of the summands by the binomial formula

However, this formula is true only if the summands commute (i.e. that ), which is implied if they belong to a structure that is commutative. It follows that in computer algebra, many algorithms involving integer exponents must be changed when the exponentiation bases do not commute. Some general purpose computer algebra systems use a different notation (sometimes  instead of ) for exponentiation with non-commuting bases, which is then called non-commutative exponentiation.

Combinatorial interpretation

Such functions can be represented as -tuples from an -element set (or as -letter words from an -letter alphabet).

{| class="wikitable"
!
!The  possible -tuples of elements from the set 
|-
|0 = 0
|
|-
|1 = 1
|(1, 1, 1, 1)
|-
|2 = 8
|(1, 1, 1), (1, 1, 2), (1, 2, 1), (1, 2, 2), (2, 1, 1), (2, 1, 2), (2, 2, 1), (2, 2, 2)
|-
|3 = 9
|(1, 1), (1, 2), (1, 3), (2, 1), (2, 2), (2, 3), (3, 1), (3, 2), (3, 3)
|-
|4 = 4
|(1), (2), (3), (4)
|-
|5 = 1
|()
|}

Particular bases

Powers of ten

Exponentiation with base  is used in scientific notation to denote large or small numbers.

Powers of two

Powers of  appear in set theory, since a set with  members has a power set, the set of all of its subsets, which has  members.

The positive integer powers  give the number of possible values for an -bit integer binary number; for example, a byte may take  different values.

Powers of one

Every power of one equals: . This is true even if  is negative.

The first power of a number is the number itself:

Powers of zero
If the exponent  is positive, the th power of zero is zero: .

The expression  is either defined as 1, or it is left undefined.

Powers of negative one
If  is an even integer, then . This is because a negative number multiplied by another negative number cancels out, and gives a positive number.

If  is an odd integer, then . This is because there will be a remaining  after removing all  pairs.

For a similar discussion of powers of the complex number , see .

Large exponents
The limit of a sequence of powers of a number greater than one diverges; in other words, the sequence grows without bound:
 as  when 

This can be read as "b to the power of n tends to +∞ as n tends to infinity when b is greater than one".

Powers of a number with absolute value less than one tend to zero:
 as  when 

Any power of one is always one:
 for all  if 

If ,  alternates between larger and larger positive and negative numbers as  alternates between even and odd, and thus does not tend to any limit as  grows.

A particularly important case is
 as 

Power functions

Real functions of the form , where , are sometimes called power functions. Functions with this kind of symmetry  are called even functions.

When  is odd, 's asymptotic behavior reverses from positive  to negative . For ,  will also tend towards positive infinity with increasing , but towards negative infinity with decreasing . Functions with this kind of symmetry  are called odd functions.

For , the opposite asymptotic behavior is true in each case.

Table of powers of decimal digits

Rational exponents

The equality on the right may be derived by setting  and writing 

If  is a positive rational number,  by definition.

All these definitions are required for extending the identity  to rational exponents.

On the other hand, there are problems with the extension of these definitions to bases that are not positive real numbers. For example, a negative real number has a real th root, which is negative, if  is odd, and no real root if  is even. In the latter case, whichever complex th root one chooses for  the identity  cannot be satisfied. For example,  

Real exponents
For positive real numbers, exponentiation to real powers can be defined in two equivalent ways, either by extending the rational powers to reals by continuity (below), or in terms of the logarithm of the base and the exponential function (below). The result is always a positive real number, and the identities and properties shown above for integer exponents remain true with these definitions for real exponents. The second definition is more commonly used, since it generalizes straightforwardly to complex exponents.

On the other hand, exponentiation to a real power of a negative real number is much more difficult to define consistently, as it may be non-real and have several values (see ). One may choose one of these values, called the principal value, but there is no choice of the principal value for which the identity

is true; see . Therefore, exponentiation with a basis that is not a positive real number is generally viewed as a multivalued function.

Limits of rational exponents

Since any irrational number can be expressed as the limit of a sequence of rational numbers, exponentiation of a positive real number  with an arbitrary real exponent  can be defined by continuity with the rule

where the limit is taken over rational values of  only. This limit exists for every positive  and every real .

For example, if , the non-terminating decimal representation  and the monotonicity of the rational powers can be used to obtain intervals bounded by rational powers that are as small as desired, and must contain 

So, the upper bounds and the lower bounds of the intervals form two sequences that have the same limit, denoted 

See also Well-defined expression.

The exponential function

The exponential function is often defined as  where  is Euler's number. For avoiding circular reasoning, this definition cannot be used here. So, a definition of the exponential function, denoted  and of Euler's number are given, which rely only on exponentiation with positive integer exponents. Then a proof is sketched that, if one uses the definition of exponentiation given in preceding sections, one has 

There are many equivalent ways to define the exponential function, one of them being

One has  and the exponential identity  holds as well, since

and the second-order term  does not affect the limit, yielding .

It follows from the preceding equations that  when  is an integer (this results from the repeated-multiplication definition of the exponentiation). If  is real,  results from the definitions given in preceding sections, by using the exponential identity if  is rational, and the continuity of the exponential function otherwise.

This extended exponential function still satisfies the exponential identity, and is commonly used for defining exponentiation for complex base and exponent.

Powers via logarithms
Specifically, the fact that the natural logarithm  is the inverse of the exponential function  means that one has
 
for  every . For preserving the identity  one must have

This agrees with the definition given above using rational exponents and continuity, with the advantage to extend straightforwardly to any complex exponent.

Complex exponents with a positive real base

This satisfies the identity 

In general,
 is not defined, since  is not a real number. If a meaning is given to the exponentiation of a complex number (see , below), one has, in general,

Euler's formula,

where the absolute value of the trigonometric factor is one. This results from

Non-integer powers of complex numbers

In the preceding sections, exponentiation with non-integer exponents has been defined for positive real bases only. For other bases, difficulties appear already with the apparently simple case of th roots, that is, of exponents  where  is a positive integer. Although the general theory of exponentiation with non-integer exponents applies to th roots, this case deserves to be considered first, since it does not need to use complex logarithms, and is therefore easier to understand.

th roots of a complex number
Every nonzero complex number  may be written in polar form as 

The polar form of the product of two complex numbers is obtained by multiplying the absolute values and adding the arguments. It follows that the polar form of an th root of a complex number can be obtained by taking the th root of the absolute value and dividing its argument by :

This can be done  times, and provides the  th roots of the complex number.

It is usual to choose one of the  th root as the principal root. The common choice is to choose the th root for which  that is, the th root that has the largest real part, and, if they are two, the one with positive imaginary part. This makes the principal th root a continuous function in the whole complex plane, except for negative real values of the radicand. This function equals the usual th root for positive real radicands.  For negative real radicands, and odd exponents, the principal th root is not real, although the usual th root is real. Analytic continuation shows that the principal th root is the unique complex differentiable function that extends the usual th root to the complex plane without the nonpositive real numbers.

If the complex number is moved around zero by increasing its argument, after an increment of  the complex number comes back to its initial position, and its th roots are permuted circularly (they are multiplied by ). This shows that it is not possible to define a th root function that is continuous in the whole complex plane.

Roots of unity

The th roots of unity are the  complex numbers such that , where  is a positive integer. They arise in various areas of mathematics, such as in discrete Fourier transform or algebraic solutions of algebraic equations (Lagrange resolvent).

Geometrically, the th roots of unity lie on the unit circle of the complex plane at the vertices of a regular -gon with one vertex on the real number 1.

Complex exponentiation 

In all cases, the complex logarithm is used to define complex exponentiation as

where  is the variant of the complex logarithm that is used, which is, a function or a multivalued function such that 

for every  in its domain of definition.

Principal value
The principal value of the complex logarithm is the unique function, commonly denoted  such that, for every nonzero complex number , 

and the imaginary part of  satisfies

If  is real and positive, the principal value of the complex logarithm is the natural logarithm: 

where  is the principal value of the logarithm.

The function  is holomorphic except in the neighbourhood of the points where  is real and nonpositive.

If  is real and positive, the principal value of  equals its usual value defined above. If  where  is an integer, this principal value is the same as the one defined above.

Multivalued function
In this case, it is useful to consider these functions as multivalued functions.

If  denotes one of the values of the multivalued logarithm (typically its principal value), the other values are   where  is any integer. Similarly, if  is one value of the exponentiation, then the other values are given by

where  is any integer.

Different values of  give different values of  unless  is a rational number, that is, there is an integer  such that  is an integer. This results from the periodicity of the exponential function, more specifically, that  if and only if  is an integer multiple of 

In the case  these values are the same as those described in § th roots of a complex number.

Computation
Although this can be described by a single formula, it is clearer to split the computation in several steps.

The principal value of this logarithm is  where  denotes the natural logarithm. The other values of the logarithm are obtained by adding  for any integer .
Final result.

Examples

In both examples, all values of  have the same argument.

Failure of power and logarithm identities
Some identities for powers and logarithms for positive real numbers will fail for complex numbers, no matter how complex powers and complex logarithms are defined as single-valued functions. For example:

Irrationality and transcendence

This results from the theory of algebraic extensions.

Integer powers in algebra
The definition of exponentiation with positive integer exponents as repeated multiplication may apply to any associative operation denoted as a multiplication. The definition of  requires further the existence of a multiplicative identity.

An algebraic structure consisting of a set together with an associative operation denoted multiplicatively, and a multiplicative identity denoted by 1 is a monoid. In such a monoid, exponentiation of an element  is defined inductively by
 
  for every nonnegative integer .

If  is a negative integer,  is defined only if  has a multiplicative inverse.

These definitions are widely used in many areas of mathematics, notably for groups, rings, fields, square matrices (which form a ring). They apply also to functions from a set to itself, which form a monoid under function composition. This includes, as specific instances, geometric transformations, and endomorphisms of any mathematical structure.

When there are several operations that may be repeated, it is common to indicate the repeated operation by placing its symbol in the superscript, before the exponent. For example, if  is a real function whose valued can be multiplied,  denotes the exponentiation with respect of multiplication, and  may denote exponentiation with respect of function composition. That is, 

and

Commonly,  is denoted  while  is denoted

In a group

A multiplicative group is a set with as associative operation denoted as multiplication, that has an identity element, and such that every element has an inverse.

So, if  is a group,  is defined for every  and every integer .

The set of all powers of an element of a group form a subgroup.

Order of elements play a fundamental role in group theory. For example, the order of an element in a finite group is always a divisor of the number of elements of the group (the order of the group). The possible orders of group elements are important in the study of the structure of a group (see Sylow theorems), and in the classification of finite simple groups.

Superscript notation is also used for conjugation; that is, where g and h are elements of a group. This notation cannot be confused with exponentiation, since the superscript is not an integer. The motivation of this notation is that conjugation obeys some of the laws of exponentiation, namely  and

In a ring
In a ring, it may occur that some nonzero elements satisfy  for some integer . Such an element is said to be nilpotent. In a commutative ring, the nilpotent elements form an ideal, called the nilradical of the ring.

If the nilradical is reduced to the zero ideal (that is, if  implies  for every positive integer ), the commutative ring is said reduced. Reduced rings important in algebraic geometry, since the coordinate ring of an affine algebraic set is always a reduced ring.

The nilradical is the radical of the zero ideal. A radical ideal is an ideal that equals its own radical. In a polynomial ring  over a field , an ideal is radical if and only if it is the set of all polynomials that are zero on an affine algebraic set (this is a consequence of Hilbert's Nullstellensatz).

Matrices and linear operators
If A is a square matrix, then the product of A with itself n times is called the matrix power.  Also  is defined to be the identity matrix, and if A is invertible, then .

Matrix powers appear often in the context of discrete dynamical systems, where the matrix A expresses a transition from a state vector x of some system to the next state Ax of the system.  This is the standard interpretation of a Markov chain, for example.  Then  is the state of the system after two time steps, and so forth:  is the state of the system after n time steps.  The matrix power  is the transition matrix between the state now and the state at a time n steps in the future.  So computing matrix powers is equivalent to solving the evolution of the dynamical system.  In many cases, matrix powers can be expediently computed by using eigenvalues and eigenvectors.

Apart from matrices, more general linear operators can also be exponentiated.  An example is the derivative operator of calculus, which is a linear operator acting on functions  to give a new function .  The n-th power of the differentiation operator is the n-th derivative:

These examples are for discrete exponents of linear operators, but in many circumstances it is also desirable to define powers of such operators with continuous exponents.  This is the starting point of the mathematical theory of semigroups.  Just as computing matrix powers with discrete exponents solves discrete dynamical systems, so does computing matrix powers with continuous exponents solve systems with continuous dynamics.  Examples include approaches to solving the heat equation, Schrödinger equation, wave equation, and other partial differential equations including a time evolution.  The special case of exponentiating the derivative operator to a non-integer power is called the fractional derivative which, together with the fractional integral, is one of the basic operations of the fractional calculus.

Finite fields

A field is an algebraic structure in which multiplication, addition, subtraction, and division are defined and satisfy the properties that multiplication is associative and every nonzero element has a multiplicative inverse. Common examples are the complex numbers and their subfields, the rational numbers and the real numbers, which have been considered earlier in this article, and are all infinite.

A finite field is a field with a finite number of elements. For every such , there are fields with  elements. The fields with  elements are all isomorphic, which allows, in general, working as if there were only one field with  elements, denoted 

One has

for every 

In  the Freshman's dream identity 

is true for the exponent . As  in  It follows that the map

The Diffie–Hellman key exchange is an application of exponentiation in finite fields that is widely used for secure communications. It uses the fact that exponentiation is computationally inexpensive, whereas the inverse operation, the discrete logarithm, is computationally expensive. More precisely, if  is a primitive element in  then  can be efficiently computed with exponentiation by squaring for any , even if  is large, while there is no known algorithm allowing retrieving  from  if  is sufficiently large.

Powers of sets 

When  is endowed with some structure, it is frequent that  is naturally endowed with a similar structure. In this case, the term "direct product" is generally used instead of "Cartesian product", and exponentiation denotes product structure.

Sets as exponents

A -tuple  of elements of  can be considered as a function from  This generalizes to the following notation.

This exponential notation is justified by the following canonical isomorphisms (for the first one, see Currying):

where  denotes the Cartesian product, and  the disjoint union.

One can use sets as exponents for other operations on sets, typically for direct sums of abelian groups, vector spaces, or modules. For distinguishing direct sums from direct products, the exponent of a direct sum is placed between parentheses. For example,  denotes the vector space of the infinite sequences of real numbers, and  the vector space of those sequences that have a finite number of nonzero elements. The latter has a basis consisting of the sequences with exactly one nonzero element that equals , while the Hamel bases of the former cannot be explicitly described (because their existence involves Zorn's lemma).

In category theory

This means the functor "exponentiation to the power " is a right adjoint to the functor "direct product with ".

This generalizes to the definition of exponentiation in a category in which finite direct products exist: in such a category, the functor  is, if it exists, a right adjoint to the functor  A category is called a Cartesian closed category, if direct products exist, and the functor  has a right adjoint for every .

Repeated exponentiation

Just as exponentiation of natural numbers is motivated by repeated multiplication, it is possible to define an operation based on repeated exponentiation; this operation is sometimes called hyper-4 or tetration. Iterating tetration leads to another operation, and so on, a concept named hyperoperation. This sequence of operations is expressed by the Ackermann function and Knuth's up-arrow notation. Just as exponentiation grows faster than multiplication, which is faster-growing than addition, tetration is faster-growing than exponentiation.

Limits of powers
Zero to the power of zero gives a number of examples of limits that are of the indeterminate form 00. The limits in these examples exist, but have different values, showing that the two-variable function  has no limit at the point . One may consider at what points this function does have a limit.

Under this definition by continuity, we obtain:

This may make the definition  obtained above for negative  problematic when  is odd, since in this case  as  tends to  through positive values, but not negative ones.

Efficient computation with integer exponents
Computing bn using iterated multiplication requires  multiplication operations, but it can be computed more efficiently than that, as  illustrated by the following example.  To compute 2100, apply Horner's rule to the exponent 100 written in binary: 
.  
Then compute the following terms in order, reading Horner's rule from right to left.

This series of steps only requires 8 multiplications instead of 99.

For some exponents (100 is not among them), the number of multiplications can be further reduced by computing and using the minimal addition-chain exponentiation. However, in practical computations, exponentiation by squaring is efficient enough, and much more  easy to implement.

Iterated functions
Function composition is a binary operation that is defined on functions such that the codomain of the function written on the right is included in the domain of the function written on the left. It is denoted  and defined as

If the domain of a function  equals its codomain, one may compose the function with itself an arbitrary number of time, and this defines the th power of the function under composition, commonly called the th iterate of the function.

When a multiplication is defined on the codomain of the function, this defines a multiplication on functions, the pointwise multiplication, which induces another exponentiation. When using functional notation, the two kinds of exponentiation are generally distinguished by placing the exponent of the functional iteration before the parentheses enclosing the arguments of the function, and placing the exponent of pointwise multiplication after the parentheses. Thus  and  When functional notation is not used, disambiguation is often done by placing the composition symbol before the exponent; for example  and  For historical reasons, the exponent of a repeated multiplication is placed before the argument for some specific functions, typically the trigonometric functions. So,   and  both mean  and not  which, in any case, is rarely considered. Historically, several variants of these notations were used by different authors.

In this context, the exponent  denotes always the inverse function, if it exists. So  For the multiplicative inverse fractions are generally used as in

In programming languages
Programming languages generally express exponentiation either as an infix operator or as a function application, as they do not support superscripts. The most common operator symbol for exponentiation is the caret (^). The original version of ASCII included an uparrow symbol (↑), intended for exponentiation, but this was replaced by the caret in 1967, so the caret became usual in programming languages.
The notations include:
 x ^ y: AWK, BASIC, J, MATLAB, Wolfram Language (Mathematica), R, Microsoft Excel, Analytica, TeX (and its derivatives), TI-BASIC, bc (for integer exponents), Haskell (for nonnegative integer exponents), Lua and most computer algebra systems.
 x ** y. The Fortran character set did not include lowercase characters or punctuation symbols other than +-*/()&=.,' and so used ** for exponentiation (the initial version used a xx b instead.). Many other languages followed suit: Ada, Z shell, KornShell, Bash, COBOL, CoffeeScript, Fortran, FoxPro, Gnuplot, Groovy, JavaScript, OCaml, F#, Perl, PHP, PL/I, Python, Rexx, Ruby, SAS, Seed7, Tcl, ABAP, Mercury, Haskell (for floating-point exponents), Turing, VHDL.
 x ↑ y: Algol Reference language, Commodore BASIC, TRS-80 Level II/III BASIC.
 x ^^ y: Haskell (for fractional base, integer exponents), D.
 x⋆y: APL.

In most programming languages with an infix exponentiation operator, it is right-associative, that is, a^b^c is interpreted as a^(b^c). This is because (a^b)^c is equal to a^(b*c) and thus not as useful. In some languages, it is left-associative, notably in Algol, Matlab and the Microsoft Excel formula language.

Other programming languages use functional notation:
 (expt x y): Common Lisp.
 pown x y: F# (for integer base, integer exponent).

Still others only provide exponentiation as part of standard libraries:
 pow(x, y): C, C++ (in math library).
 Math.Pow(x, y): C#.
 math:pow(X, Y): Erlang.
 Math.pow(x, y): Java.
 [Math]::Pow(x, y): PowerShell.

See also

 Double exponential function
 Exponential decay
 Exponential field
 Exponential growth
 List of exponential topics
 Modular exponentiation
 Scientific notation
 Unicode subscripts and superscripts
 xy = yx
 Zero to the power of zero

Notes

References

Exponentials
Unary operations